Tamayoa is a genus of air-breathing land snails, terrestrial pulmonate gastropod mollusks in the family Scolodontidae.

Tamayoa is the type genus of the subfamily Tamayoinae.

Species
Species within the genus Tamayoa include:
 Tamayoa banghaasi Thiele - synonym: Happia banghaasi
 Tamayoa decolorata (Drouët, 1859)
 Tamayoa venezuelensis H. B. Baker

References

External links 

Scolodontidae